The electoral district of Fitzroy was an electorate of the Victorian Legislative Assembly in the British colony and later Australian state of Victoria, centred on the inner-Melbourne suburb of Fitzroy.

Members for Fitzroy

Election results

References

Former electoral districts of Victoria (Australia)
1877 establishments in Australia
1927 disestablishments in Australia
1958 establishments in Australia
1967 disestablishments in Australia